This article contains information about the literary events and publications of 1825.

Events
February 19 – Franz Grillparzer's König Ottokars Glück und Ende (The Fortune and Fall of King Ottokar, published 1823) is first performed, at the Burgtheater in Vienna, after Caroline Augusta, Empress of Austria, urges her husband Francis I of Austria to lift the censorship restrictions on it.
April – Charles Lamb retires from his clerical post with the East India Company in London on superannuation.
May 6–June 15 – The two youngest Brontë sisters, Maria and Elizabeth, die at home at Haworth Parsonage aged 11 and 9, of consumption they have contracted at Cowan Bridge School.
May 6 – French bibliophile, translator, lawyer and politician Henri Boulard (born 1754) dies, leaving a library of over half a million books, one of the greatest private book collections in history.
December 17 – John Neal moves in with and becomes personal secretary of Jeremy Bentham, who recruits Neal to his utilitarian philosophy.
unknown date – The first publication of Samuel Pepys' Diary (1660–1669) appears, edited by Lord Braybrooke from a transcription by Rev. John Smith.

New books

Fiction
John and Michael Banim – Tales of the O'Hara Family
Lydia Maria Child – The Rebels
Sarah Green – Parents and Wives
Wilhelm Hauff – Der Mann im Mond (The Man in the Moon)
Barbara Hofland – Moderation
Charles Maturin  – Leixlip Castle
John Neal – Brother Jonathan: or, the New Englanders
Sir Walter Scott
 Lord Normanby – Matilda
The Betrothed
The Talisman

Children
Maria Hack –English Stories. Third Series, Reformation under the Tudor Princes

Drama
 Caroline Boaden – Quite Correct
Aleksander Griboyedov – Woe from Wit (part published)
James Sheridan Knowles – William Tell
Harriet Lee – The Three Strangers
 John Poole – Paul Pry
Alexander Pushkin – Boris Godunov (published 1831, but approved for the stage only in 1866)
 William Tennant – John Balliol
 Charles Walker – The Fall of Algiers

Poetry
Anna Laetitia Barbauld – Works
Felicia Hemans – The Forest Sanctuary
Esaias Tegnér – Frithiol's Saga

Non-fiction
Jean Anthelme Brillat-Savarin – Physiologie du goût (The Physiology of Taste)
Samuel Taylor Coleridge – Aids to Reflection
George Gleig – The Subaltern
William Hazlitt – The Spirit of the Age
Sarah Kemble Knight – The Journal of Madam Knight
John Claudius Loudon – The Encyclopaedia of Agriculture
Thomas Moore – Memoirs of the Life of Richard Brinsley Sheridan
Harriette Wilson – The Memoirs of Harriette Wilson, Written by Herself

Births
January 11 – Bayard Taylor, American poet (died 1878)
February 13 – Julia C. R. Dorr, American author (died 1913)
February 18 – Mór Jókai, Hungarian novelist and dramatist (died 1904)
March 3 – Annie Keary, English novelist, poet and children's writer (died 1879)
March 16 – Lucy Virginia French, American author (died 1881)
April 3 – William Billington, English poet and publican (died 1884)
April 13 – Minnie Mary Lee, American author of poems, stories, sketches and novels (died 1903)
April 20 – Emma Jane Guyton (Worboise), English novelist and magazine editor (died 1887)
April 24 – R. M. Ballantyne, Scottish writer of juvenile fiction (died 1894)
May 21 – Nancy H. Adsit, American art writer, lecturer, educator (died 1902)
June 7 – R. D. Blackmore, English novelist (died 1900)
June 14 – Mary Elizabeth Beauchamp, English-born American author and educator (died 1903)
July 2 – Richard Henry Stoddard, American critic and poet (died 1903)
July 13 – Madeleine Vinton Dahlgren, American writer, translator, and anti-suffragist (died 1889)
July 28 – E. J. Richmond, American author (died 1918)
October 19 – Jeanette Granberg, Swedish playwright and translator (died 1857)
October 23 – Walter Gregor, Scottish folklorist, linguist and pastor (died 1897)
Uncertain date – Annie French Hector (pseudonym Mrs Alexander), Irish-born novelist (died 1902)

Deaths
March 9 – Anna Laetitia Barbauld, English poet, essayist and children's author (born 1743)
April 23 – Maler Müller, German poet, dramatist and painter (born 1749)
June 4 – Morris Birkbeck, American writer and social reformer (born 1764)
June 11 – Helen Craik, Scottish novelist and poet (born c. 1751)
August 10 – Joseph Harris (Gomer), Welsh poet and journalist (born 1773)
November 7 – Charlotte Dacre, English poet and Gothic novelist (born c. 1772)
November 25 – Desfontaines-Lavallée, French novelist and dramatist (born 1733)
December 5 – Mary Whateley (Mary Darwall), English poet (born 1738)
unknown dates
Huang Peilie (黄丕烈), Chinese bibliophile (born 1763)
Shen Fu (沈復), Chinese novelist and chronicler (born 1763)

Awards
Chancellor's Gold Medal – Edward Bulwer-Lytton
Newdigate Prize – Richard Clarke Sewell, "The Temple of Vesta"

References

 
Years of the 19th century in literature